Park Yoo-na (born December 23, 1997) is a South Korean actress under 8D Creative's WIP sub-label. She is best known for her roles in the television series My ID is Gangnam Beauty (2018), Sky Castle (2018–2019), Hotel del Luna (2019), True Beauty (2020-2021), and Rookie Cops (2022).

Personal life
She attended Hanlim Multi Art School as a practical dance major before turning to acting.

Filmography

Film

Television series

Web series

Music video appearances

References

External links

 

1997 births
Living people
21st-century South Korean actresses
South Korean film actresses
South Korean television actresses

Hanlim Multi Art School alumni